The College Creek Ranger Station, near Imnaha, Oregon outside of Enterprise, Oregon, was built in 1935.  It is located along the Imnaha River in the Wallowa–Whitman National Forest.  It includes rustic architecture of USDA.  It was listed on the National Register of Historic Places in 1991;  the listing includes four contributing buildings.

It was designed by the U.S. Forest Service's Pacific Northwest Region architects and was built by the Civilian Conservation Corps.  This station "is a good example of an architectural locution invested with special aesthetic and associative values by the [U.S. Forest Service] that created it."

See also
National Register of Historic Places listings in Wallowa County, Oregon

References 

Buildings and structures completed in 1935
Buildings and structures in Wallowa County, Oregon
United States Forest Service ranger stations
Historic districts on the National Register of Historic Places in Oregon
National Register of Historic Places in Wallowa County, Oregon
1935 establishments in Oregon